Hermann Neufert (6 July 1858 in Altstadt near Lüben, Province of Silesia, Prussia – 1935 in Berlin, Germany) was a German educator who founded (along with Prof. Dr. Bernhard Bendix) the world's first open air school, and the international movement which followed.

Neufert visited schools in Lähn and Groß-Glogau, where he graduated his secondary education in 1877. At Silesian Frederick William University he studied History, Geography and German studies. In March 1883 he got his doctoral degree. In May 1884 he passed an equivalent of today's state examinations, then called examen pro facultate docendi. After a compulsory probationary year between Easter 1884 and Easter 1885 which he served partially at the two secondary schools Maria-Magdalenen-Gymnasium and Johannes-Gymnasium at Breslau he started as a regular teacher at the latter. After six years, at Easter 1891 he got a call to Städtische Höhere Lehranstalt zu Charlottenburg near Berlin which was also a secondary school. He taught there for eight years. On 1 April 1899 he got schools inspector of the city of Charlottenburg.

References

1858 births
1935 deaths
German academic administrators